Queensland Tennis Centre, known during its development as the Tennyson Tennis Centre, is a tennis venue in Tennyson, Brisbane, Australia.
It is an A$82 million tennis facility opened on 2 January 2009 at the site of the demolished Tennyson Power Station.

Since January 2009 the Queensland Tennis Centre has been the host centre for combined men and women's international tennis tournament entitled the Brisbane International, a combination of the former Next Generation Adelaide International event in Adelaide and the Mondial Gold Coast Women's championships.

Construction

It was designed by internationally recognised stadium designers HOK Sport Venue Event and The Mirvac Group's in-house architectural practice, HPA Pty Ltd and constructed by Mirvac as part of the Tennyson Riverside development.

The main court was designed to incorporate a PTFE glass fibre fabric roof. This tensile membrane structure allows diffused light through into the arena reducing the need for artificial lighting. The light weight of the fabric also reduced the amount of steel required and saved on building costs. Brisbane-based company MakMax Australia (Taiyo Membrane Corporation) supplied and installed this roof along with other smaller outdoor structures at this venue.

It has twenty-three International Tennis Federation standard tennis courts, including the centre court and two showcase courts, representing all playing surfaces (hardcourt, clay and grass).

The centre court Pat Rafter Arena, named in honour of the Australian tennis player Patrick Rafter, has a seating capacity of 5,500 (with an extra temporary seating of 1,500 bringing total capacity to 7,000).

Davis and Fed Cup fixtures
The Queensland Tennis Centre has hosted several ties in the Davis Cup and Fed Cup representative tournaments.

See also

 List of tennis stadiums by capacity
 List of indoor arenas in Australia

References

External links

Details of Development

Tennis venues in Australia
Sports venues in Brisbane
Sports venues completed in 2009
Tensile membrane structures
2009 establishments in Australia
Venues of the 2032 Summer Olympics and Paralympics